John Strachan (born April 1961) is a literary critic, historian and poet, Professor of English and Pro Vice-Chancellor at Bath Spa University, England. Strachan is the current Director of GuildHE Research and Co-Chair of the Charles Lamb Society.  He is Associate Editor of the Oxford Companion to English Literature.  Strachan has previously held professorships at Northumbria University and the University of Sunderland.  Educated at the University of Southampton (BA) and Wolfson College, Oxford (MPhil, DPhil). Strachan specialises in Romanticism, especially late Georgian comic writing (he is the editor of British Satire 1785-1840 (2003) and Parodies of the Romantic Age (1999), and the relationship between advertising and literature.  He has published two volumes of poetry and, with Richard Terry, is author of a successful text book,Poetry, which was published in 2000 (second edition, 2011) by Edinburgh University Press.   Strachan has also published numerous articles in the fields of history, sport studies, poetry, and Irish culture. In 2013 he collaborated with numerous artists and poets to create Their Colours and their Forms: Artists' Responses to Wordsworth, which included some of his own poetry. He lives in Bath, Somerset. As an author, he is widely held in libraries worldwide.

Selected Bibliography 
 Songs of Place and Time: Birdsong and the Dawn Chorus in Natural History and the Arts, Gaia Project, co-editor with Mike Collier and Bennett Hogg, 2020
 Wordsworth/Basho: Walking Poets, Art Editions North/ Kakimori Bunko, co-editor with Mike Collier, 2016
 Waterloo: The Field of Blood. Poems, Art Editions North, 2015
 Their Colours and their Forms: Artists' Responses to Wordsworth, co-editor with Carol McKay, 2013, Wordsworth Trust, 2013
 Advertising, Literature and Print Culture in Ireland, 1891-1922, co-author with Claire Nally, Palgrave Macmillan, 2012
 Poetry, co-author with Richard Terry, second edition, Edinburgh University Press, 2011
 Ireland at War and Peace, co-editor with Alison O'Malley-Younger, Cambridge Scholars Publishing, 2011
 Key Concepts in Romantic Literature, co-author with Jane Moore, Palgrave Macmillan, 2010
 Ireland: Revolution and Evolution, co-editor with Alison O'Malley-Younger, Peter Lang, 2010
 The Oxford Companion to English Literature, 7th edition, general editor Dinah Birch, associate editor for Romanticism, Oxford University Press, 2009
 Advertising and Satirical Culture in the Romantic Period, Cambridge University Press, 2007
 Essays on Modern Irish Literature, co-editor with Alison O'Malley-Younger, Sunderland University Press, 2007
 A Routledge Literary Sourcebook on the Poems of John Keats, Routledge, 2003
 Leigh Hunt: Poetical Works, 2 vols, editor, Pickering and Chatto, 2003
 British Satire 1785-1840, 5 vols, general editor, Pickering and Chatto, 2003
 Parodies of the Romantic Age, 5 vols, co-general editor, Pickering and Chatto, 1999

References 

British poets
1961 births
Academics of Bath Spa University
People from Bath, Somerset
Living people